Taunah is a Syrian village located in the Awj Subdistrict in Masyaf District.  According to the Syria Central Bureau of Statistics (CBS), Taunah had a population of 1,056 in the 2004 census. Its inhabitants are predominantly Alawites.

References 

Populated places in Masyaf District
Alawite communities in Syria